Government Engineering College or Government College of Engineering refers to one of several engineering colleges located in India:
Government College of Technology, Coimbatore
Government Engineering College, Ajmer
Government Engineering College, Banswara
Government College of Engineering, Amravati
Government College of Engineering, Aurangabad
Government College of Engineering, Bargur
Government Engineering College, Bhuj
Government Engineering College, Bilaspur
Government College of Engineering, Dharmapuri
Government Engineering College, Gandhinagar
Government Engineering College Raichur
Government Engineering College, Hassan
Government Engineering College, Idukki
 Government Engineering College, Jabalpur
Government Engineering College, Jaffarpur, New Delhi
Government Engineering College, Jagdalpur
Government Engineering College, Jhalawar
Government College of Engineering, Karad
Government College of Engineering, Kannur
Government College of Engineering, Kannur
Government College of Engineering, Keonjhar
Government Engineering College, Kozhikode
Government Engineering College, Munger
Government Engineering College, Patan
Government Engineering College Raipur
Government Engineering College, Rewa
Government College of Engineering, Salem
Government Engineering College, Sreekrishnapuram
Government College of Engineering, Tirunelveli
Government Engineering College, Trivandrum
Government Engineering College, Thrissur
Government Engineering College, Wayanad
Jalpaiguri Government Engineering College
Jawaharlal Nehru Government Engineering College
Kalyani Government Engineering College
Government College of Engineering, Vellore
Purulia Government Engineering College
Vishwakarma Government Engineering College, Chandkheda, Ahmedabad
Government Engineering College, Bhavnagar